Donjet Shkodra (born 30 April 1989) is a Kosovo Albanian professional footballer who plays as an attacking midfielder for KF Gjilani.

Club career

Eendracht Aalst
On 24 April 2013, Shkodra joined Eendracht Aalst by signing a one-year contract with an option of a further one. He made his official debut for the club on 3 August 2013 by playing as a substitute in a 2–0 away defeat against Antwerp.

Deinze
For the 2015–16 season Shkodra signed with Deinze of Belgian First Division B. He league debut would come on 8 August 2015 in team's 1–0 win over Patro Eisden, where Shkodra was sent off in the 82nd minute after a second bookable offence.

Flamurtari Vlorë
On 4 July 2016, Shkodra completed a move to Flamurtari Vlorë of Albanian Superliga as a free agent. He was presented on the same day, where he was handed squad number 10. He made his competitive debut on 7 September in the opening league match of 2016–17 season, scoring his team's only goal in a 2–1 away defeat to Skënderbeu Korçë. In the second matchday against the newly promoted side Luftëtari Gjirokastër, Shkodra scored two goals, both long-range strikes, in an eventual 5–0 home win for the first three points of the campaign. On 5 November, Shkodra scored the first goal of the 2–0 home win against Skënderbeu Korçë, giving the team its second consecutive league win.

On 6 December, he was again on the scoresheet, netting the winner against Tirana to give the team 3 vital points. Later that month, Shkodra suffered an injury in right leg which kept him sidelined for about three months. He returned in action in March of the following year, making his first appearance on 11th, starting and playing the whole match against Partizani Tirana. He finished his first and only Flamurtari season by making 30 appearances, including 26 in league, scoring 11 goals, including 9 leagues goals, as the team avoided the relegation by just one point. In June 2017, Shkodra confirmed his departure from the club.

Skënderbeu Korçë
On 3 June 2017, Skënderbeu Korçë's president Ardian Takaj confirmed that the club has reached an agreement with Shkodra. Three days later, Shkodra confirmed via an open letter that he was leaving Flamurtari for Skënderbeu. He was presented to the media on 7 June where he penned a two-year contract. He stated: "I'm happy to be part of the best team in Albania in the recent years. I'm ready to give 100% for this team.

He played mostly as second-fiddle in Skënderbeu's historic run in the 2017–18 UEFA Europa League qualifying rounds, becoming the first Albanian club to pass four rounds. He made only four appearances, all of them as substitute, colleting 103 minutes on the field. He started the domestic season by scoring in the first leg of 2017–18 Albanian Cup first round against Adriatiku Mamurras. Three days later he played his first Albanian Superliga match for Skënderbeu in the opening matchday against Flamurtari Vlorë, contributing in a 2–0 home win. He scored his maiden league goal in the next matchday at newly promoted Kamza, finished in a 1–1 draw.

Shkodra failed to make an impact and remained mostly to bench during his stint, making only 6 league appearances, collecting only 298 minutes.

Kukësi
On 3 January 2018, Shkodra agreed personal terms and joined defending champions Kukësi. He signed a contract running until 2020 worth €8,000 per month and was allocated squad number 10. Shkodra made his competitive debut later on 26 January in the 1–3 win at Vllaznia Shkodër, assisting the second goal scored by Filip Žderić. His first score-sheet contributions came in his sixth league appearance for the club, netting the second in an eventual 2–2 home draw versus his ex team Skënderbeu Korçë. He refused to celebrate in the process.

Shakhter Karagandy
On 24 February 2019, Shakhter Karagandy announced the signing of Shkodra on a one-year contract.
On 20 June 2019, Shakhter Karagandy extended their contract with Shkodra until the end of the 2020 season.

Style of play
He is famous due to his long-range strikes and free kicks.

Personal life
Shkodra was born in Pristina to Kosovar Albanian parents but grew up in Gnjilane. He emigrated to Belgium from Kosovo in 1998 during the war time along with his family.

Career statistics

References

External links
Donjet Shkodra profile  at Deinze
Donjet Shkodra profile at Eendracht Aalst

1989 births
Living people
Sportspeople from Pristina
Kosovo Albanians
Association football midfielders
Kosovan footballers
K.S.V. Waregem players
Sportkring Sint-Niklaas players
K.S.K. Ronse players
S.C. Eendracht Aalst players
K.M.S.K. Deinze players
Flamurtari Vlorë players
KF Skënderbeu Korçë players
FK Kukësi players
FC Shakhter Karagandy players
FC Zhetysu players
Kategoria Superiore players
Challenger Pro League players
Kazakhstan Premier League players
Kosovan expatriate footballers
Kosovan expatriate sportspeople in Belgium
Expatriate footballers in Belgium
Kosovan expatriate sportspeople in Albania
Expatriate footballers in Albania
Kosovan expatriate sportspeople in Kazakhstan
Expatriate footballers in Kazakhstan